Gibbonsia elegans, the spotted kelpfish, is a species of clinid native to subtropical waters of the Pacific Ocean from central California, U.S. to southern Baja California, Mexico. This species can reach a maximum length of  TL. This species feeds on benthic crustaceans (amphipods, isopods, crabs), gastropods, and polychaete worms. The genus Gibbonsia is named after Dr. William P. Gibbsons who was a naturalist in the California Academy of Science. It is found in three different colors depending on their habitat. Males and females do not show sexual dimorphism.

Description
Gibbonsia elegans is a brightly colored fish with a slender body. The maximum length it reaches is 120 mm. Gibbonsia elegans is found in various color morphs; mainly red, brown or green. Male and females are not distinct in their color morphology i.e. they are not sexually dimorphic. Instead, they exhibit sexual differences in body size and the color of their bellies. They show dichromatism in their belly color; Females have yellow or tan bellies and males and immature females have white bellies. Secondly, females grow to be longer in length than males.

Habitat and distribution
The spotted kelpfish is found in shallow waters like those off the coast of Southern California. They are commonly found in the shallow subtidal habitats that are plant covered and in rocky intertidal areas along the coast of Southern California. They are often found living with red or brown algae or green surfgrass. Kelpfish are found in various color morphs that match their plant habitat. In that effort, they are found in red, green or brown forms. They are capable of changing their color over a period of time (within several weeks). They color changes were determined solely by the color of their habitat and not on their diet. Color changes are also dependent on season. During the winter, more red Gibbonsia elegans were found when red algae were dominant. In the spring and summer, green and brown morphs are prevalent. Male and female Gibbonsia elegans are commonly found in different vertical distributions. Females are more frequently found in shallow habitats whereas males are found more commonly as the depth increases.

Diet
They primarily feed on epiphytic crustaceans. These crustaceans are found on the same plants that Gibbonsia elegans live on, including brown and red algae. The epiphytic crustaceans also match the color of their plant habitat. Their diet consists of large crustaceans like the hump-backed shrimp, Spirontocaris paludicola and S. picta. Spirontocaris picta was found to be the significant portion of Gibbonsia elegans''' stomach content in one study. Polychaete worms and microgastropods were also found in abundance in their stomach contents.

Related species
The giant kelpfish, Heterostichus rostratus, is another species of the family Clinidae that closely resembles Gibbonsia elegans. It is found in Southern California areas similar to Gibbonsia elegans. The two species also occurs in similar color morphs; brown, green, red. However, Heterostichus grows up to 61 cm in length, about four times longer than Gibbonsia elegans.

References

Stepien, Carol A., Marlen Glattke, and Keith M. Fink. "Regulation and Significance of Color Patterns of the Spotted Kelpfish, Gibbonsia elegans Cooper, 1864 (Blennioidei: Clinidae)." Copeia 1988, no. 1 (1988): 7. doi:10.2307/1445916.
Mitchell, Donald F. "An Analysis of Stomach Contents of California Tide Pool Fishes." American Midland Naturalist 49, no. 3 (1953): 862. doi:10.2307/2485213.
Williams, George C. "Differential Vertical Distribution of the Sexes in Gibbonsia elegans'' with Remarks on Two Nominal Subspecies of This Fish." Copeia 1954, no. 4 (1954): 267. doi:10.2307/1440040.

elegans
Fish described in 1864
Taxa named by James Graham Cooper